Hillenbrand is a surname. Notable people with the surname, including von Hillenbrand, include:
 Carole Hillenbrand (born 1943), British Islamic scholar
 Laura Hillenbrand, author of Seabiscuit: An American Legend
 Nico Hillenbrand, German footballer
 Robert Hillenbrand, (* 1941), British art historian
 Shea Hillenbrand, Major League Baseball player

See also
 Hillenbrand Industries, holding company that changed its name to Hill-Rom on 1 April 2008.